Petar Manola (born 28 February 1918 – 2004) was a Bosnian Serb footballer who played as a midfielder.

Club career
Born in Jajce, Bosnia and Herzegovina, then still part of the Austro-Hungarian Empire, he started his career in Slavija Sarajevo where he played between 1931 and 1936 but, his greatest success was achieved while playing in BSK Beograd, between 1936 and 1942, and made part of the memorable midfield line formed with Prvoslav Dragičević and Gustav Lechner, that won the Yugoslav First League in 1939. After the start of the World War II, he left Yugoslavia and continued his career in Lazio Rome playing in Italian Serie A.  Between January 1947 and summer 1948 he played in France, first in Second Division Olympique Lyonnais, and then in Ligue 1 famous club Red Star Paris. Afterwards, he returned to Italy where he played in S.S.C. Napoli, in the 1948–49 season, and then represented lower leagues clubs like S.S. Cavese 1919, Benevento Calcio and Turris 1944. He ended his playing career in 1956.

He died in 2004.

International career
While playing in BSK Belgrade he played nine matches for the Kingdom of Yugoslavia national team.

Honours
BSK Belgrade
 Yugoslav First League: 1938-39

References

External sources
 
 

1918 births
2004 deaths
People from Jajce
Serbs of Bosnia and Herzegovina
Association football midfielders
Yugoslav footballers
Yugoslavia international footballers
Serbian footballers
Yugoslav First League players
Serie A players
Ligue 1 players
FK Slavija Sarajevo players
OFK Beograd players
S.S. Lazio players
Olympique Lyonnais players
Red Star F.C. players
S.S.C. Napoli players
Benevento Calcio players
Serbian expatriate footballers
Expatriate footballers in Italy
Expatriate footballers in France